Alfred George Kruger III (born February 18, 1979) is a male hammer thrower from the United States. His personal best is 79.26 metres, achieved in August 2004 in Berea.

He finished fourth at the 2006 IAAF World Cup. In addition, he competed at the 2004 Olympic Games, the 2005 World Championships, the 2007 World Championships, the 2008 Olympic Games, the 2009 World Championships, the 2012 Olympic Games and the 2013 World Championships without reaching the final.

He is from the same home town, Sheldon, Iowa, as Olympic gold medalist and University of Iowa wrestling coach Tom Brands. Kruger attended Morningside College in Sioux City, Iowa where he was a Division II student-athlete in both football and track and field. AG is the youngest child of Al and Linda Kruger. AG married his wife Laura in the fall of 2007. The two had their first child, a son, Alfred George Kruger IV in August 2011.

Achievements

References

External links
 
 
 
 
 

1979 births
Living people
American male hammer throwers
Athletes (track and field) at the 2004 Summer Olympics
Athletes (track and field) at the 2008 Summer Olympics
Athletes (track and field) at the 2012 Summer Olympics
Morningside University alumni
Olympic track and field athletes of the United States
People from Sheldon, Iowa
Male weight throwers
Pan American Games track and field athletes for the United States
Athletes (track and field) at the 2007 Pan American Games
Sportspeople from Iowa
World Athletics Championships athletes for the United States
Track and field athletes from Iowa
USA Outdoor Track and Field Championships winners
USA Indoor Track and Field Championships winners